Caffè San Marco is a historic café in Trieste, Italy founded in 1914 that became famous as a rendezvous for intellectuals and writers including Italo Svevo, James Joyce and Umberto Saba, a tradition that continues to date with Claudio Magris. It is located in via Battisti 18. A meeting point for Trieste's irredentists, the café was destroyed by Austro-Hungarian troops during the first World War but was reopened when hostilities ended.

The interiors reflect the Vienna Secession style popular when the café was founded. Part of the frescos are attributed to Vito Timmel.

The café is owned by Italy's largest insurance company (also based in Trieste), Assicurazioni Generali.

Italians campaigned to save the historic café in 2013 and it has now been restored, incorporating a bookshop.

References

External links

 Brief History of Caffè San Marco (in Italian)
 Youtube video detailing the cafè's history (in Italian)
 Caffé San Marco website (in Italian and English)

Coffeehouses and cafés in Italy
Buildings and structures in Trieste
Restaurants established in 1914
Italian companies established in 1914
Art Nouveau architecture in Italy
Art Nouveau restaurants
1914 establishments in Austria-Hungary